Emma Tsesarskaya (1909–1990) was a Ukrainian Soviet stage and film actress.

Selected filmography
 Women of Ryazan (1927)
 And Quiet Flows the Don (1930)
 Revolt of the Fisherman (1934)
 A Girl with a Temper (1939)
 The Liberated Earth (1946)

References

Bibliography 
 Eisner, Lotte H. The Haunted Screen: Expressionism in the German Cinema and the Influence of Max Reinhardt. University of California Press, 1969.

External links 
 

1909 births
1990 deaths
Ukrainian film actresses
Soviet film actresses
Actors from Dnipro